Downers Grove South High School, or DGS, and locally referred to as "South", is a public four-year high school located at the corner of Dunham Road and 63rd Street in Downers Grove, Illinois, a western suburb of Chicago, Illinois, in the United States. Its principal is Arwen Lyp. It is part of Community High School District 99, which also includes Downers Grove North High School. The South campus draws students from Downers Grove (south of 55th St.), the majority of Woodridge, half of Darien (west of Cass Ave.), and small sections of Bolingbrook and Westmont.

History
The school opened its doors in 1964 and the student population at Downers Grove High School was split in two, half going to the original structure now named Downers Grove North, and half going to the new building. It has since undergone significant renovations to bring it up to date, including a $49.5 million voter referendum for the district in 2001. In the summer of 2008 the school embarked on a parking space expansion on campus, which had been plagued by delays.  Despite several causes for postponement, parking lot adjustments were prepared in time to effectively start the 2008–09 school year. On Friday, June 22, 2011 at around 8:30 pm, South High School received extensive damage to its outdoor sports areas during a two-minute EF1 tornado: fences around the tennis courts were flattened, portable toilets and rows of bleachers were flipped upside-down as well as some fallen branches across the school's football/soccer field.

In March 2018, the community surrounding the school voted to approve the Master Facility Plan (MFP), witch laid out plans to completely overhaul both South and neighboring North high school into modern learning facilities. Construction started at the end of the 2018-2019 school year, and was completed at the start of the 2021-2022 school year.

Academics
In 2008, Downers Grove South had an average composite ACT score of 22.0, 0.5 points above the state average. DGS graduated 96.7% of its senior class. Downers Grove South has not made Adequate Yearly Progress (AYP) on the Prairie State Achievement Examination, which with the ACT, are the assessment tools used to fulfill mandates of the federal No Child Left Behind Act.  While the school as a whole did make AYP, two of the six student subgroups failed to meet expectations in reading.

Athletics
South competes in the West Suburban Conference. The school is also a member of the Illinois High School Association (IHSA), which governs most sports and competitive activities in the state of Illinois.  The school teams are stylized as the Mustangs.

The school sponsors interscholastic teams for young men and women in: basketball, cross country, golf, gymnastics, soccer, swimming & diving, tennis, fishing, track & field, Ultimate frisbee, and volleyball.  Young men may compete in baseball, football, 
Co-ed Varsity Cheerleading, and wrestling, while young women may also compete in badminton, bowling, cheerleading, and softball. The DGS Fillies (Varsity) and Pintos (JV) dance and pom teams perform at half time of men's home football and basketball games and compete at the Team Dance Illinois State Competition every year.

The following teams have won in their respective IHSA sponsored state tournament or meet:

 Dance Team: State Champions (2005, 2006, 2007, 2008)
 Co-Ed Cheerleading: State Champions (2003–04), National Champions (2004–05)
 Football: 8A State Champions (2001–02)
 Soccer (boys): State Champions (2004–05)
 Softball: State Champions (1992–93)
 Volleyball (girls): State Champions (1996–97, 1999–2000, 2002–03)
 Volleyball (boys): State Champions (2012–13)

Activities
Downers Grove South has won several state championship for its extracurricular activities in its history, including three in performance in the round, two in chess, and three from the Fillies Pom and Dance Team. Its speech team has won 18 IHSA state championships, more than any other school. In 1997 it became the only team to win the speech state championship four years in a row, and in 2009 the only school to win that same title 6 years in a row. The radio station, WDGC –  88.3FM, is run by students during school hours, usually chosen as an elective. Their Marching Band won the 2019 University of Illinois Marching Band Championship.

Notable alumni
 Greg Corner, bass guitarist for Kill Hannah and Co-Host and Musical Director for JBTV.
 Nick Burdi, professional baseball player
 Zack Burdi, professional baseball player for the Chicago White Sox
 Bryan Mullins, basketball coach for the Southern Illinois Salukis
 Scott Daly, NFL player
 Mary T. McDowell, CEO, Mitel; former CEO, Polycom
 Lauren Frost, actress best known as Ruby Mendel in the Disney Channel Original Series Even Stevens and Disney Channel Original Movie The Even Stevens Movie
 Tori Franklin, Olympic triple jumper
 Bob Bryar, drummer for the American rock band My Chemical Romance

References

External links
 Official website

Public high schools in Illinois
Educational institutions established in 1964
Downers Grove, Illinois
Schools in DuPage County, Illinois
1964 establishments in Illinois